The diocese of Presidio (Latin: Dioecesis Praesidiensis) is a suppressed and titular see of the Roman Catholic Church.

History 
Presidium, identifiable with ruins at Henchir-Somâa in present-day Tunisia, is an ancient episcopal seat of the Roman province of Byzacena.

There are two bishops known from this diocese.

The Leonatist a Donatist, who took part in the Carthage conference of 411, which brought together the Catholic and Donatist bishops of Roman North Africa. 
Fausto attended the synod gathered in Carthage by the Vandal king Huneric in 484, after which Fausto was exiled.

Today, Presidio survives as a titular see; the current titular bishop is Roger William Gries, former auxiliary bishop of Cleveland.

bishops

 Leonzio † (mentioned in 411) (Donatist bishop) 
 Fausto † (mentioned in 484) 
 Giuseppe Carata † (May 17, 1965 - April 8, 1967 appointed titular bishop of Canne) 
 Władysław Miziołek † (19 February 1969 - 12 May 2000 deceased) 
 Roger William Gries, since 3 April 2001

References

Catholic titular sees in Africa
Suppressed Roman Catholic dioceses
Ruins in Tunisia